Axel Johansson may refer to:

Axel Johansson (rower) (1885–1979), Swedish rower
Axel Johansson (speed skater) (1910–1983), Swedish speed skater
Axel Elveljung, né Axel Johansson, born 1989, Swedish footballer